Al-Maslaha Sport Club, is an Iraqi football team based in Baghdad, that plays in the Iraq Division Three.

Managerial history
 Haider Mohammed

See also
 2016–17 Iraq FA Cup

References

External links
 Al-Maslaha SC on Goalzz.com
 Iraq Clubs- Foundation Dates

Football clubs in Iraq
2003 establishments in Iraq
Association football clubs established in 2003
Football clubs in Baghdad